The Battle of Suomussalmi was a battle fought between Finnish and Soviet forces in the Winter War. The action took place from 30 November 1939 to 8 January 1940. The outcome was a Finnish victory against superior forces. This battle is considered the clearest, most important, and most significant Finnish victory in the northern half of Finland. In Finland, the battle is still seen today as a symbol of the entirety of the Winter War itself.

Course of battle
On 30 November 1939 the Soviet 163rd Rifle Division crossed the border between Finland and the Soviet Union and advanced from the north-east towards the village of Suomussalmi. The Soviet objective was to advance to the city of Oulu, effectively cutting Finland in half. This sector had only one Finnish battalion (Er.P 15), which was placed near Raate, outside Suomussalmi.

Suomussalmi was taken with little resistance on 7 December (only two incomplete companies of covering forces led a holding action between the border and Suomussalmi), but the Finns destroyed the village before this, to deny the Soviets shelter, and withdrew to the opposite shore of lakes Niskanselkä and Haukiperä.

The first extensive fight started on 8 December, when Soviet forces began to attack across the frozen lakes to the west. Their attempt failed completely. The second part of Soviet forces led the attack to the northwest on Puolanka, that was defended by the Er.P 16 (lit. 16th detached battalion), that had just arrived. This attempt also failed.

On 9 December the defenders were reinforced with a newly founded regiment (JR 27). Colonel Hjalmar Siilasvuo was given the command of the Finnish forces and he began immediate counter-measures to regain Suomussalmi. The main forces advanced on Suomussalmi, but failed to take the village, suffering serious losses. On 24 December Soviet units counterattacked, but failed to break through the surrounding Finnish forces.

Reinforced with two new regiments (JR 64 and JR 65), the Finns again attacked on 27 December. This time, they took the village, and the Soviets retreated. A large part of them managed to reach the Russian border along the Kiantajärvi lake. During this time, the Soviet 44th Rifle Division had advanced from the east towards Suomussalmi. It was entrenched on the road between Suomussalmi and Raate and got caught up in the retreat of the other Soviet forces.

Between 4 and 8 January 1940 the 44th Rifle Division was divided into isolated groups and destroyed by the Finnish troops (in a tactic known as motti), leaving much heavy equipment for the Finnish troops.

Outcome

The battle resulted in a major victory for the Finns. If the Soviet Union had captured the city of Oulu, the Finns would have had to defend the country on two fronts and an important rail link to Sweden would have been severed. The battle also gave a decisive boost to the morale of the Finnish army.

In addition, Finnish forces on the Raate-Suomussalmi road captured a large amount of military supplies, including tanks (43), field guns (70), trucks (278), horses (1,170), anti-tank guns (29), machine guns (300), rifles (6000) and other weapons, which were greatly needed by the Finnish army.

Alvar Aalto sculpted a memorial for the Finnish soldiers who died.

Analysis
The Battle of Suomussalmi is often cited as an example of how a small force, properly led and fighting in familiar terrain, can defeat a vastly numerically superior enemy. Factors which contributed to the Finnish victory included:

Finnish troops possessed higher mobility due to skis and sleds; by contrast, Soviet heavy equipment confined them to roads.
The Soviet objective to cut Finland in half across the Oulu region, while appearing reasonable on a map, was inherently unrealistic, as the region was mostly forested marshland, with its road network consisting mainly of logging trails. Mechanized divisions had to rely on them and so became easy targets for the mobile Finnish ski troops.
Finnish strategy was flexible and often unorthodox, for example, Finnish troops targeted Soviet field kitchens, which demoralised Soviet soldiers fighting in a sub-Arctic winter.
The Soviet army was poorly equipped, especially with regard to winter camouflage clothing; by contrast, Finnish troops' equipment were well-suited for warfare in deep snow and freezing temperatures.
The Finnish army had very high morale, resulting from the fact that it was defending their nation. Soviet troops, however, had exclusively-political reasons for their attack, consequently losing their will to fight soon despite continual efforts by Soviet propagandists.
An additional factor remained Soviet counter-intelligence failures: Finnish troops often intercepted the Soviet communications, which relied heavily on standard phone lines.
The Finnish tactics involved simplicity where needed, as the final assault was a simple head-on charge, which decreased the chances of tactical errors. Rough weather also favoured comparatively-simple plans.

See also
Battle of Raate Road
List of Finnish military equipment of World War II
List of Soviet Union military equipment of World War II

References

Citations

Bibliography

External links
Battle of Suomussalmi. by Sami H. E. Korhonen (2006), www.winterwar.com. Texts with plenty of maps. In two parts, the second part. Retrieved 2014-03-16.
Winter War This site is produced by the Finnish Military Museum (in English, Finnish, Russian, Swedish). Dozens of battle maps made by Ari Raunio.
Finnish Wartime Photograph Archive Thousands of photos from January 1939 to December 1945

Suomussalmi
1939 in Finland
1940 in Finland
Suomussalmi
History of Kainuu
December 1939 events
January 1940 events